Snodgrassia petrophracta is a species of moth of the family Tortricidae. It is found in Papua New Guinea.

References

	

Moths described in 1938
Archipini